Tomichi is a rural locality (a selo) and the administrative center of Tomichevsky Selsoviet of Belogorsky District, Amur Oblast, Russia. The population was 1,419 as of 2018. There are 18 streets.

Geography 
Tomichi is located 33 km southwest of Belogorsk (the district's administrative centre) by road. Kustanayevka is the nearest rural locality.

References 

Rural localities in Belogorsky District